Deleted – The Game is an interactive web drama developed by indie producers GEN247 about a group of characters who unwittingly become entangled in an identity theft scheme to rig the 2008 US elections. The show's creators combined a 12-webisode drama series with a sprawling interactive social game that allowed the audience to help the show's characters solve problems and puzzles along the way communicating through popular social media like MySpace and Facebook and blogs. In the course of these interactions with the characters, the audience would affect the way events in the story unfolded.

Production
The project was conceived in March 2008, went into production in May 2008. A pre-marketing campaign was released June 2008 quickly finding a following on the ARG site Unfiction. The show was officially launched on 15 August 2008 on the Deleted – The Game website but was widely distributed on a creative commons license sharealike scheme through YouTube, Kewego and iTunes.

Filming took place entirely in the New York environs with audience members noting that a fair number of scenes were filmed in the New York's West Village and Meat Packing District although latter scenes did play out in Brooklyn's Williamsburg neighborhood. There are various accounts of the production budget but the project seems to have been produced on a $1,000 to $2,000 per minute scale.

Reviews

Awards
13th Webby Awards, June 8, 2009 - The title was officially nominated and won the People's Voice Award for Best Experimental Online Film & Video category and was made an official honoree for Best Use of Interactive Video.

14th Webby Awards, June, 2010 - The title was officially nominated for Best Experimental Online Film & Video category and  Best Use of Interactive Video.

References

American drama web series